CRND may refer to:

 Commissioners for the Reduction of the National Debt
 Centre for Research in Neurodegenerative Diseases